The 2018 FIG World Cup circuit in Rhythmic Gymnastics is a series of competitions officially organized and promoted by the International Gymnastics Federation.

With stopovers in Europe and Asia, the World Cup competitions are scheduled for March 30–April 1 in Sofia (BUL), April 13-15 in Pesaro (ITA), April 20–22 in Tashkent (UZB), April 27–29 in Baku (AZE). World Challenge Cup competitions are scheduled for May 4-6 in Guadalajara (ESP), May 11–13 in Portimão (POR), August 17–19 in Minsk (BLR), and August 24–26 in Kazan (RUS).

Formats

Medal winners

All-around

Individual

Group

Apparatus

Hoop

Ball

Clubs

Ribbon

5 hoops

3 balls and 2 ropes

Overall medal table

See also
 2018 FIG Artistic Gymnastics World Cup series

References

Rhythmic Gymnastics World Cup
2018 in gymnastics